Wellington Koo (born 31 October 1958) is a Taiwanese lawyer and politician. During his legal career, Koo represented several politicians. His own political career began with a term on the National Assembly, followed by an unsuccessful campaign for the Taipei mayoralty in 2013. In 2016, he was elected a legislator at large representing the Democratic Progressive Party. Koo left the Legislative Yuan to lead the Ill-gotten Party Assets Settlement Committee. In 2017, he became chairman of the Financial Supervisory Commission. Koo was appointed Secretary-General of the National Security Council in 2020.

Early life
Koo was born in Taipei in 1958, to Mainlander parents originally from Shanghai. He attended National Taiwan University before earning a master's degree in public service law from New York University. Koo passed the Taiwanese bar exam in 1983, and began teaching law at Chinese Culture University in 1993, a job he held until 2003.

Legal career
Koo worked for Formosa Transnational Attorneys at Law, a firm founded by Fan Kuang-chun and John Chen. While with the firm, Koo, Lee Fu-tien, and four other Taiwanese lawyers served as liaisons between taishang based in mainland China and the businesspeople's Chinese attorneys. He also mentored Su Chiao-hui and represented Chen Shui-bian and Annette Lu during the 2004 presidential election. Other clients include Chao Chien-ming in a 2006 embezzlement scandal, and the Hung Chung-chiu family in 2013. Koo has also served as legal counsel for Lee Teng-hui and Tsai Ing-wen, as well as the student activists who led the 2014 Sunflower protests and the 2015 protest of curriculum guidelines. In 2014, he joined the defense team of Chiou Ho-shun, a man subject to the longest criminal case in Taiwanese judicial history who had been imprisoned for the murder of Lu Cheng in 1987. In December 2015, Koo, representing the Democratic Progressive Party as a whole, charged Kuomintang chairman Eric Chu with attempting to buy votes. He also acted as the DPP's legal counsel in a case against a group of KMT legislators who alleged that Tsai Ing-wen had engaged in land speculation.

Political career
In June 2005, Koo served on the National Assembly. In September 2013, Koo announced his intent to run for the mayoralty of Taipei as a member of the Democratic Progressive Party. A primary held in May 2014, after the Sunflower Movement, was won by Pasuya Yao, and Koo dropped out of the race. Yao later dropped out of the race, endorsing  Ko Wen-je, who won the mayoral election as an independent candidate.

Koo, then the director of the Judicial Reform Foundation, was selected for the Democratic Progressive Party's proportional representation ballot in November 2015. Listed forth on the ballot during the 2016 legislative election, he won a seat in the Legislative Yuan. In his time as legislator, he called for the establishment of a government commission on human rights. Koo also coauthored amendments to the Act Governing Relations with Hong Kong and Macau in an attempt to simplify  the process for political asylum-seekers from those areas to Taiwan. He also proposed an amendment to the Narcotics Hazard Prevention Act, stating that people involved in the illegal drug trade should be treated for addiction prior to being put on trial. The Act Governing the Handling of Ill-gotten Properties by Political Parties and Their Affiliate Organizations, which he helped to write, was passed in July and Koo was named to a commission set up to investigate questionable assets in August. He stepped down from the Legislative Yuan to take the appointment, and was succeeded in office by Julian Kuo. Koo assumed the committee chairmanship despite the Kuomintang citing Article 20 of the Act, which requires nonpartisan committee members, in its objections to Koo's leadership. Koo named most of the committee members on 24 August, and the group was officially established on 31 August.

Koo was appointed to the chairmanship of the Financial Supervisory Commission in September 2017, succeeding Lee Ruey-tsang on the same day that William Lai replaced Lin Chuan as premier. Koo stated shortly before taking control of the FSC that he sought to implement a "differentiated management style" in which financial institutions that ranked higher would be allowed more regulatory freedom to innovate within the financial services sector, and those institutions that did less well would be granted less latitude. Koo left the Financial Supervisory Commission in May 2020 and became the secretary-general of the National Security Council.

Personal life
Koo is married to Wang Mei-hua.

References

1958 births
Living people
Politicians of the Republic of China on Taiwan from Taipei
Democratic Progressive Party Members of the Legislative Yuan
Party List Members of the Legislative Yuan
Members of the 9th Legislative Yuan
National Taiwan University alumni
New York University School of Law alumni
20th-century Taiwanese lawyers
Academic staff of the Chinese Culture University
Taiwanese legal scholars
Taiwanese people of Chinese descent
21st-century Taiwanese lawyers
Spouses of Taiwanese politicians